Jesús Olmedo (born 1973) is a Spanish actor, best known for his performance in the television series Hospital Central, 90-60-90: Diario secreto de una adolescente, Hispania, la leyenda and Imperium.

Biography 
Born in Seville on 6 or 7 October 1973, Olmedo landed his first role in 1997 in the television series Hostal Royal Manzanares. After his performance in the former, he resumed collaboration with Lina Morgan in the series Academia de baile Gloria. His television career consolidated with his performance in the 2001 telenovela Esencia de poder, earning further popularity for his role in the television series Hospital Central. He then starred as Bruno in the 2009 series 90-60-90, diario secreto de una adolescente. After performing the role of Marco in Hispania, la leyenda (2010–2012) and Imperium (2012), initially as villainous Roman general, later turned into a slave and gladiator, Olmedo starred in the daily television series Gran Reserva. El origen, Amar es para siempre, Centro médico and Mercado central.

Rather known for his television performances, his films credits include minor performances in Noviembre, Recambios, 15 días contigo, 8 citas, and the role of 'Chambelán' in the two movies of La herencia Valdemar.

Filmography 

Television

References 
Informational notes

Citations

1973 births
21st-century Spanish male actors
Spanish male television actors
Male actors from Andalusia
Living people